American Cinema Productions was an independent Hollywood film production company that was founded in 1975 and filed for bankruptcy in 1981.

The company, a division of American Communications Industries, began as a distribution operation known as American Cinema Releasing before several early successes led it to branch out into film production.

Its distribution wing is best known for the second Chuck Norris martial arts film, Good Guys Wear Black, which led American Cinema to produce a number of his subsequent action movies, including The Octagon. The company also produced Charlie Chan and the Curse of the Dragon Queen and Tough Enough.

American Cinema is also credited for resurrecting and modifying the four-wall distribution method for theatrical releases where a distributor rents the movie theatre for a window of time and reaps the full box-office receipts.

History 
American Cinema's origins were as American Financial Resources, a film financing company run by chief executive Michael Leone out of a bank building in Torrance, California. He chose the location for its vicinity to the airport which made it easy for investors to fly in and out of the area. Many American Cinema projects were directly financed as tax-shelter films overseen by producer Roger Riddell and president Alan Belkin.

Leone and other investors from Torrance raised $500,000 to produce Dogs (1977). Leone also helped fund and was executive producer on Go Tell the Spartans, A Different Story and The Great Smokey Roadblock (all 1978) and low-budget documentary The Late Great Planet Earth (1979), based on Hal Lindsey's book and narrated by Orson Welles.

Good Guys Wear Black was the first production distributed by American Cinema's distribution team. The low-budget 1978 film featured Norris, a relative unknown outside martial arts circles, in top billing a year after he scored a box-office hit with Breaker, Breaker. Good Guys Wear Black grossed $18 million at the box office using a city-by-city rollout model which saw Norris spend nearly a year on the road on a publicity tour. He has estimated he conducted 2,000 interviews in that period and says at one point had laryngitis.

They also released Dirt (1979), a collection of off-road competition footage captured by Riddell who also appeared in the film.

American Communication Industries was formed in 1979 as the parent company for American Cinema Productions and American Cinema Releasing.

The marketing model for Good Guys Wear Black, designed by head of advertising Sandra Shaw and head of production Jean Higgins, would be replicated on films that followed. It used a four-wall distribution method first pioneered in the 1960s but largely abandoned by the late 1970s. The strategy was to couple promotional appearances by cast members with a radio and TV ad spot blitz, particularly on late-night programming where airtime was cheap. The intention was to saturate the market with buzz that overshadowed other films in the local market.

After a number of early successes, American Cinema relocated to an office in Hollywood, across the street from Grauman's Chinese Theatre and began full production of its own projects under American Cinema Productions. The first was Norris' 1979 follow-up A Force of One.

The company maintained its distribution structure for both its own films and a number of low-budget acquisitions that included Fade to Black and The Silent Scream.

Within several years, the owners of ACP saw potential for the company to grow larger and began to finance more ambitious projects with higher budgets, starting with Charlie Chan and the Curse of the Dragon Queen, a project designed to attract foreign buyers with a cast that included Peter Ustinov and Angie Dickinson.

Some employees say the strategic shifts made in the board room towards larger productions and marketing budgets are ultimately what led to company to falter.

One of ACP's final films, I, the Jury, was wracked with production issues that included a looming Directors Guild of America strike in the summer of 1981 and a dispute with the screenwriter and original director Larry Cohen over its budget. Cohen was ultimately fired from the film after less than a week of production of principal photography for running the film $100,000 over budget and one day over schedule. By the time production wrapped under a new director, the film was almost double its original budget. After ACP's collapse into bankruptcy, I, the Jury would ultimately be distributed by Twentieth-Century Fox.

The Entity faced a different round of setbacks in the months leading to ACP's bankruptcy filing. The film was originally announced by The Hollywood Reporter in March 1980 as being one of three American Cinema productions filming on location in Europe and the Middle East. Ultimately, the film shot in California with production wrapping in summer 1981. It did not see a theatrical release in the United States until early 1983 under Twentieth-Century Fox.

In December 1981, Variety reported that ACP's assets had been seized by its primary debtor, Bankers Trust of New York, and the company was in debt for approximately $57 million. Metro-Goldwyn-Mayer acquired ACP's film library on February 7, 2019.

References 

 
Film distributors of the United States
Film production companies of the United States
Entertainment companies based in California